Samten Bhutia is an Indian film director and writer from Sikkim. He has been actively involved in Nepalese film industry over the last decade. He recently directed Taandro which was screened at the Dhaka International film festival. His first film Latter was well received by people from Nepal and India. He also acted in a short film, Myth.

Filmography

Director
(2017) Saadhesaat- feature film
(2016) Anaagat – feature film
(2015) Taandro – Deciphering Me – feature film
(2012)  In Search of Nation – feature film (associate director)
(2009) Letter (Nepal) – feature film
(2003) Masked Fair – short film
(2003) Naango Dhad (Sikkim) – tele film
(2000) Naya Disha – documentary

 Screenplay Letter (Nepali)Naango Dhad (Sikkim)Masked Fair (Sikkim)Luv Sab (Nepali)Aadha Antya (Nepali)Taandro (Nepali)Saadhesaat (Nepali)

 Actor 
(2004) Mero Uthney Palo – feature film (Nepali) 
(2003) Myth – short film (English)

 Production Design 
(2015) Jhumki – feature film (Nepal) 
(2012) In Search of Nation'' – feature film (Nepal)

References

Living people
Male actors from Sikkim
1976 births
21st-century Indian male actors
21st-century Indian film directors
Indian male screenwriters
Screenwriters from Sikkim
People from Gangtok district